Madessetia is a genus of beetles in the family Buprestidae, containing the following species:

 Madessetia bicolor Bellamy, 2006
 Madessetia unicolor Bellamy, 2006

References

Buprestidae genera